Limax doriae, common name Doria's slug, is a species of air-breathing land slug, a terrestrial pulmonate gastropod mollusk in the family Limacidae, the keelback slugs.

Etymology
Jules René Bourguignat (1829 - 1892) named this species in honor of the Marquis Giacomo Doria, an Italian naturalist, herpetologist, and politician.

Subspecies
Limax doriae simplex Lessona & Pollonera 1882 (Piemonte, Liguria, Toscana); 
Limax doriae lineatus Lessona & Pollonera 1882 (Piemonte, Liguria, Toscana); 
Limax doriae rubronotatus Lessona & Pollonera 1882 (Piemonte, Liguria, Toscana); 
Limax doriae fuscus Lessona & Pollonera 1882 (Piemonte, Liguria); 
Limax doriae brunneus Lessona & Pollonera 1882 (Piemonte, Liguria); 
Limax doriae lineatus Lessona & Pollonera 1882 (Piemonte, Liguria); 
Limax doriae sanguineus Lessona & Pollonera 1882 (Piemonte, Liguria).

Description

Distribution
This species is endemic to the French Alpes-Maritimes and to a few northern Italian regions: (Piedmont, Liguria and Tuscany).

Habitat
This species prefers humid and shady areas, and is found resting under stones.

Bibliography
 Sordelli, F. 1871. Anatomia del Limax Doriae, Bourg., nei suoi rapporti con altre specie congeneri. - Atti della Società Italiana di Scienze Naturali 13 (3) 1870 : 242-253, Tav. 3. Milano.
 Lessona, Mario & Carlo Pollonera 1882: Monografia dei limacidi italiani.  S.1-82, Taf.1-3. Turin, Loescher.
 Welter-Schultes, F. (2012): European non-marine molluscs, a guide for species identification. 760 pp.

References

External links
 Clemens M. Brandstetter Gallery of Limax
 Natura Mediterraneo
 WMSDB

Limacidae
Gastropods described in 1861